Podocarpus brevifolius is a species of conifer in the family Podocarpaceae. It is found only on Mount Kinabalu and surrounding ridges in Sabah, Malaysia.

References

brevifolius
Endemic flora of Borneo
Taxonomy articles created by Polbot
Flora of Mount Kinabalu